Lady Cai may refer to:

Cai Yan 
Lady Cai (蔡氏), second wife of Han dynasty provincial governor Liu Biao